Marvell Academy is a private K-12 school in unincorporated Phillips County Arkansas, near Marvell, which was founded as a segregation academy.

History
Marvell public schools were integrated in 1965. In 1966, Marvell Academy was the first of many private schools founded by white parents in Arkansas to avoid integration. Many of the parents here were members of a White Citizens Council, believing that "Integration is the corruption of the true American heritage by alien concept and ideology". The school opened with 73 students in two frame houses across a cotton field from the area public school. The school was founded with grades 1-8. Some grades had as few as 5 students. The school added a grade each year to provide education through high school. 

By 1969, although the school was unaccredited, it had 400 students; it had only eight teachers in 11 grades. Tuition was $400 per year, and students had to supply their own textbooks. The headmaster was Charles Hinton. A 1969 Time Magazine editorial article, describing the emergence of segregation academies, noted that "Few of them are quite so openly redneck as the Marvell Academy."

In the 2015-2016 school year, the school enrolled two Hispanic students and no Black students.
As of 2019, the student body of Marvell Academy has 1% students of color.

The school is accredited by the Midsouth Association of Independent Schools (MAIS). This organization was created to legitimize segregation academies. It is not a nationally recognized accreditation agency. The Academy participates in academic competitions including spelling bee, reading fair, science fair, and art fair, as well as athletics including football, cheerleading, basketball, baseball, softball, track and field, and golf through the MAIS.

References

External links

 

Educational institutions established in 1966
Private middle schools in Arkansas
Private elementary schools in Arkansas
Private high schools in Arkansas
Schools in Phillips County, Arkansas
Segregation academies in Arkansas
1966 establishments in Arkansas